Kalyanam is a 2009 Indian Tamil-language soap opera that was aired on Sun TV. The show premiered on 2 March 2009 to 7 August 2009 at 7:30PM IST for 110 episodes. The show stars Meena, Yuvarani, Saakshi Siva, Delhi Kumar and Shanthi Williams.

The show is produced by Sathya Jyothi Films T.T.G Thyagasaravanan and Selvi Thyagarajan. The Show was directed by Viduthalai.

Plot
The story begins with a search of a boy for the heroine Anandhi by her father Varadharajan and the suitable match Raghu was found. Everyone was happy except Elango, who was lusting for his sister-in-law. He tries all the manner of tricks to spoil Anandhi's wedding.

In the course of time, during Anandhi's engagement, Raghu's grandfather is killed in an accident. Therapy Raghu's family calling off the wedding saying that she would bring ill luck to Raghu's family.

With this turn of events, Another couple who has seen Anandhi in a temple tries to make her as daughter-in-law. Varadharajan and his family are elated about this proposal from the wealthy industrialist. But Anandhi has not come out of the cancellation of her terms of engagement with Raghu, with whom she is fond of. But reluctantly agrees to marry Parthiban.

Whether Anandhi marries Raghu or Parthiban and how the murder in the flashback is going to affect either of these three lives is the plot of the story.

Cast

Main cast

 Meena
 Yuvarani
 Saakshi Siva
 Sindhu Shyam

Recurring cast

 Delhi Kumar
 Vanthana
 Brinda das
 Rajkanth
 Nesan
 Shanthi Williams
 Aswin Kumar
 Bhavani Sankar
 Sathish
 Rajkamal
 Bhavani
 Latha Rao
 Srivithiya
 Venkat

External links
 Official Website 
 Sun TV on YouTube
 Sun TV Network 
 Sun Group $

Sun TV original programming
Tamil-language crime television series
Tamil-language police television series
Tamil-language thriller television series
2009 Tamil-language television series debuts
Tamil-language television shows
2009 Tamil-language television series endings